The bulldog goodeid (Alloophorus robustus) is a species of goodeid. It is endemic to stagnant and slow-flowing waters in the Lerma–Chapala, Presa de San Juanico and Balsas basins in west-central and southwestern Mexico. Despite its relatively wide range, it is generally uncommon. This is possibly the most predatory goodeid, it feeding on other fish, crayfish, insects and other invertebrates. At up to at least  in standard length, this is likely the second-largest goodeid, after Goodea atripinnis.

References

Goodeinae
Freshwater fish of Mexico
Endemic fish of Mexico
Fish described in 1939